Car is a village and municipality in the Zagatala District of Azerbaijan. It has a population of 4,633. The municipality consists of the villages of Jar, Kebeloba, Akhakhdere, and Siliban.

References

External links

Populated places in Zaqatala District